John R. Jones (1850 – January 1, 1933) was a member of the Wisconsin State Assembly during the 1907, 1909 and 1911 sessions. Other positions he held include Chairman (similar to Mayor) of Leon, Monroe County, Wisconsin and Chairman of the Republican county committee and the county board of Monroe County, Wisconsin. He was born in Pittsburgh, Pennsylvania in 1850.

He died in Sparta, Wisconsin on January 1, 1933.

References

Politicians from Pittsburgh
People from Monroe County, Wisconsin
Mayors of places in Wisconsin
1850 births
1933 deaths
Republican Party members of the Wisconsin State Assembly